Dedekam is a surname. Notable people with the surname include:

Morten Smith Dedekam (1793–1861), Norwegian merchant and politician
Sophie Dedekam (1820–1894), Norwegian composer and diarist

Norwegian-language surnames